Acontias litoralis, the coastal dwarf legless skink or coastal legless skink, is a species of lizard in the family Scincidae. It is endemic to South Africa.

References

Acontias
Reptiles described in 1969
Reptiles of South Africa
Endemic fauna of South Africa
Taxa named by Donald George Broadley